Waitarere Beach is a small settlement in the Horowhenua District of the Manawatū-Whanganui region of New Zealand's North Island.  It is located on the South Taranaki Bight, 14 kilometres northwest of Levin, and 17 kilometres southwest of Foxton, both distances being by road.

Demographics

The population of Waitarere Beach was 678 in the 2018 New Zealand census, an increase of 93 (15.9%) since the 2013 census, and an increase of 87 (14.7%) since the 2006 census. There were 339 males and 339 females, giving a sex ratio of 1.0 males per female. Ethnicities were 627 people  (92.5%) European/Pākehā, 111 (16.4%) Māori, 6 (0.9%) Pacific peoples, and 6 (0.9%) Asian (totals add to more than 100% since people could identify with multiple ethnicities). Of the total population, 78 people  (11.5%) were under 15 years old, 78 (11.5%) were 15–29, 315 (46.5%) were 30–64, and 207 (30.5%) were over 65.

Waitarere

Waitarere had a population of 2,142 at the 2018 New Zealand census, an increase of 267 people (14.2%) since the 2013 census, and an increase of 267 people (14.2%) since the 2006 census. There were 882 households. There were 1,077 males and 1,068 females, giving a sex ratio of 1.01 males per female. The median age was 53.3 years (compared with 37.4 years nationally), with 303 people (14.1%) aged under 15 years, 258 (12.0%) aged 15 to 29, 1,014 (47.3%) aged 30 to 64, and 561 (26.2%) aged 65 or older.

Ethnicities were 88.1% European/Pākehā, 18.2% Māori, 2.0% Pacific peoples, 1.8% Asian, and 1.4% other ethnicities (totals add to more than 100% since people could identify with multiple ethnicities).

The proportion of people born overseas was 14.0%, compared with 27.1% nationally.

Although some people objected to giving their religion, 53.9% had no religion, 34.2% were Christian, 0.4% were Buddhist and 2.8% had other religions.

Of those at least 15 years old, 270 (14.7%) people had a bachelor or higher degree, and 453 (24.6%) people had no formal qualifications. The median income was $29,800, compared with $31,800 nationally. The employment status of those at least 15 was that 828 (45.0%) people were employed full-time, 288 (15.7%) were part-time, and 66 (3.6%) were unemployed.

References

Populated places in Manawatū-Whanganui
Horowhenua District